We Love the City is the third album by British indie rock band Hefner.  It was released by Too Pure in two formats in 2000, the standard version and a second version with a disc featuring videos for "I Took Her Love for Granted" and "Good Fruit," as well as a John Peel session.  The entire John Peel session was later released as the album Maida Vale.  The album was reissued in 2009.

The album features vocals on a number of tracks by Amelia Fletcher, who is the vocalist for a number of bands (Marine Research, Heavenly, Talulah Gosh). This was the first Hefner LP to feature Jack Hayter as a permanent member.

Darren Hayman, lead singer and songwriter, has described We Love the City as his "favourite Hefner record".

Track listing
 "We Love the City"
 "The Greedy Ugly People"
 "Good Fruit"
 "Painting and Kissing"
 "Hold Me Closer"
 "Don't Go"
 "The Greater London Radio"
 "As Soon As You're Ready"
 "She Can't Sleep No More"
 "The Cure for Evil"
 "The Day That Thatcher Dies"
 "Your Head to Your Toes"

The limited edition disc featured a Peel Session with the following songs:

 "The Greedy Ugly People"
 "The Cure for Evil"
 "She Can't Sleep No More"
 "The Day That Thatcher Dies"

Track listing (2009 Reissue)
CD1
 "We Love the City"
 "The Greedy Ugly People"
 "Good Fruit"
 "Painting and Kissing"
 "Hold Me Closer"
 "Don't Go"
 "The Greater London Radio"
 "As Soon As You're Ready"
 "She Can't Sleep No More"
 "The Cure for Evil"
 "The Day That Thatcher Dies"
 "Your Head to Your Toes"
 "Jubilee" (B-side)
 "Blackhorse Road" (B-side)
 "I Will Make Her Love Me" (B-side)
 "Seafaring" (B-side)
 "Christian Girls" (Boxing Version)
 "We Don't Care What They Say About Us" (B-side)
 "The Fear" (B-side)
 "The Greedy Ugly People" (Electric Sound of Joy Remix)

CD2
 "Lee Remick" (Boxing Version)
 "The Hymn for the Things We Didn't Do" (Boxing Version)
 "The Hymn for the Coffee" (Boxing Version)
 "Seafaring" (Demo)
 "Painting and Kissing" (Demo)
 "Your Head to Your Toes" (Demo)
 "Hold Me Closer" (Demo)
 "The Cure for Evil" (Demo)
 "Good Fruit" (Demo)
 "The Greedy Ugly People" (Demo)
 "Hymn for the Telephones" (1st Version)
 "Seafaring" (4-Track Demo)
 "Lee Remick" (4-Track Demo)
 "Painting and Kissing" (Rehearsal Demo)
 "China Crisis" (4-Track Demo)
 "Good Fruit" (Wisdom of Harry Remix)
 "The Greedy Ugly People" (Baxendale Remix)
 "Painting and Kissing" (Rob Lord Remix)
 "Good Fruit" (Piano Magic Remix)

References

2000 albums
Hefner (band) albums
Too Pure albums